The 1999–2000 Louisville Cardinals men's basketball team represented the University of Louisville in the 1999–2000 NCAA Division I men's basketball season. The head coach was Denny Crum and the team finished the season with an overall record of 19–12.

References 

Louisville Cardinals men's basketball seasons
Louisville
Louisville
Louisville Cardinals men's basketball, 1999-2000
Louisville Cardinals men's basketball, 1999-2000